This is a list of stations of the Barcelona Metro system.

Lines L1, L2, L3, L4, L5, L9, L10, L11 and the Funicular de Montjuïc are administered by Transports Metropolitans de Barcelona (TMB), the city's transit company. Lines L6, L7, L8 and L12 are in origin commuter train services with extended frequency and integrated into the metro network, numbered as such, and run by the public Ferrocarrils de la Generalitat de Catalunya (FGC), which belongs to the Catalan government or Generalitat de Catalunya.

Sorted alphabetically

Sorted by line

Line 1
Hospital de Bellvitge - Fondo

Hospital de Bellvitge
Bellvitge
Avinguda Carrilet (L8)
Rambla Just Oliveras
Can Serra
Florida
Torrassa (L9)
Santa Eulàlia
Mercat Nou
Plaça de Sants (L5)
Hostafrancs
Espanya (L3, L8)
Rocafort
Urgell
Universitat (L2)
Catalunya (L3, L6, L7)
Urquinaona (L4)
Arc de Triomf
Marina (T4)
Glòries (T4, T5, T6)
Clot (L2)
Navas
La Sagrera (L5)
Fabra i Puig
Sant Andreu
Torras i Bages
Trinitat Vella
Baró de Viver
Santa Coloma
Fondo (L9)

Line 2
Paral·lel - Badalona Pompeu Fabra

Paral·lel (L3, Funicular de Montjuïc)
Sant Antoni
Universitat (L1)
Passeig de Gràcia (L3, L4)
Tetuan
Monumental
Sagrada Família (L5)
Encants
Clot (L1)
Bac de Roda
Sant Martí
La Pau (L4)
Verneda
Artigues-Sant Adrià
Sant Roc (T5, T6)
Gorg (L10) (T5, T6)
Pep Ventura
Badalona Pompeu Fabra

Line 3
Zona Universitària - Trinitat Nova

Zona Universitària (L9) (T1, T2, T3)
Palau Reial (T1, T2, T3)
Maria Cristina (T1, T2, T3)
Les Corts
Plaça del Centre
Sants Estació (L5)
Tarragona
Espanya (L1, L8)
Poble Sec
Paral·lel (L2, Funicular de Montjuïc)
Drassanes
Liceu
Catalunya (L1, L6, L7)
Passeig de Gràcia (L2, L4)
Diagonal (L5; Provença: L6, L7)
Fontana
Lesseps
Vallcarca
Penitents
Vall d'Hebron (L5)
Montbau
Mundet
Valldaura
Canyelles
Roquetes
Trinitat Nova (L4, L11)

Line 4
Trinitat Nova - La Pau

Trinitat Nova (L3, L11)
Via Júlia
Llucmajor
Maragall (L5)
Guinardó – Hospital de Sant Pau
Alfons X
Joanic
Verdaguer (L5)
Girona
Passeig de Gràcia (L2, L3)
Urquinaona (L1)
Jaume I
Barceloneta
Ciutadella-Vila Olímpica (T4)
Bogatell
Llacuna
Poblenou
Selva de Mar (T4)
El Maresme-Fòrum (T4)
Besòs Mar
Besòs (T5)
La Pau (L2)

Line 5
Cornellà Centre - Vall d'Hebron

Cornellà Centre (T1, T2)
Gavarra
Sant Ildefons
Can Boixeres
Can Vidalet
Pubilla Cases
Ernest Lluch (T1, T2, T3)
Collblanc (L9, L10)
Badal
Plaça de Sants (L1)
Sants Estació (L3)
Entença
Hospital Clínic
Diagonal (L3; Provença: L6, L7)
Verdaguer (L4)
Sagrada Família (L2)
Sant Pau – Dos de Maig
Camp de l'Arpa
La Sagrera (L1, L9, L10)
Congrés
Maragall (L4)
Virrei Amat
Vilapicina
Horta
El Carmel
El Coll - La Teixonera
Vall d'Hebron (L3)

Line 6
Pl. Catalunya - Sarrià
Barcelona - Plaça Catalunya (L1, L3, L7)
Provença (L7; Diagonal: L3, L5)
Gràcia (L7)
Sant Gervasi (Plaça Molina: L7)
Muntaner
La Bonanova
Les Tres Torres
Sarrià (L12)

Line 7
Pl. Catalunya - Av. Tibidabo
Barcelona - Plaça Catalunya (L1, L3, L6)
Provença (L6; Diagonal: L3, L5)
Gràcia (L6)
Plaça Molina (Sant Gervasi: L6)
Pàdua
El Putxet
Avinguda Tibidabo (Tramvia blau)

Line 8
Barcelona - Moli Nou
Barcelona-Plaça Espanya (L1, L3)
Magòria-La Campana
Ildefons Cerdà (L10)
Europa-Fira (L9)
Gornal
Sant Josep
L'Hospitalet-Avinguda Carrilet (L1)
Almeda
Cornellà-Riera
Sant Boi
Molí Nou | Ciutat Cooperativa

Line 9
L9 Sud: Aeroport T1 - Zona Universitària
Aeroport T1
Aeroport T2
Mas Blau
Parc Nou
Cèntric
El Prat Estació
Les Moreres
Mercabarna
Parc Logístic
Fira
Europa - Fira (L8)
Can Tries - Gornal (L10)
Torrassa (L1)
Collblanc (L5)
Zona Universitària (L3) (T1, T2, T3)

L9 Nord: La Sagrera - Can Zam
La Sagrera (L1, L5 and L10)
Onze de Setembre (L10)
Bon Pastor (L10)
Can Peixauet
Santa Rosa
Fondo (L1)
Església Major
Singuerlín
Can Zam

Line 10
L10 Nord: La Sagrera - Gorg
La Sagrera (L1, L5, L9)
Onze de Setembre (L10)
Bon Pastor (L10)
Llefià
La Salut
Gorg (L2) (T5)

L10 Sud: Collblanc - ZAL | Riu Vell

 Collblanc (L9, L5)
 Torrassa  (L1, L9)
 Can Tries - Gornal (L9)
 Provençana
 Ciutat de la Justícia (L8)
 Foneria
 Foc
 Zona Franca
 Port Comercial | La Factoria
 Ecoparc
 ZAL | Riu Vell

Note 1: Wikipedia should've added a page on the actual station - Ciutat de la Justícia. There is no page on it, so Ildefons Cerdà is used as a replacement page.

Line 11
Trinitat Nova - Can Cuiàs
Trinitat Nova (L3, L4)
Casa de l'Aigua
Torre Baró-Vallbona
Ciutat Meridiana
Can Cuiàs

Line 12
Sarrià - Reina Elisenda
Sarrià (L6)
Reina Elisenda

Funicular de Montjuïc
The funicular is connected to and fare-integrated with the metro.

Paral·lel (L2, L3)
Parc de Montjuïc

See also
Disused Barcelona Metro stations
List of tram stations in Barcelona
List of railway stations in Barcelona
List of Rodalies Barcelona railway stations

External links
Transports Metropolitans de Barcelona
Ferrocarrils de la Generalitat de Catalunya
Barcelona Metro Map

Barcelona
Barcelona Metro
Metro stations